Louis Boileau-Domingue (born March 6, 1992) is a Canadian professional ice hockey goaltender for the Hartford Wolf Pack of the American Hockey League (AHL) while under contract with the New York Rangers of the National Hockey League (NHL).

Domingue was selected by the Phoenix Coyotes in the fifth round, 138th overall, of the 2010 NHL Entry Draft, with whom he spent the first portion of his career. He has also played in the NHL for the Tampa Bay Lightning, Vancouver Canucks, New Jersey Devils, Calgary Flames, and Pittsburgh Penguins.

Playing career

Early career
Domingue was drafted 13th overall by the Moncton Wildcats in the 2008 Quebec Major Junior Hockey League (QMJHL) Entry Draft, and he played major junior hockey in the QMJHL with both the Wildcats and the Quebec Remparts. In 2010 he was selected to play in the CHL/NHL Top Prospects Game. Domingue was subsequently drafted by the NHL's Phoenix Coyotes and, on June 1, 2011, he was signed by the team to a three-year, entry-level contract.

Domingue was assigned to play the 2011–12 season with the Remparts, where he led all QMJHL goaltenders with a .914 save percentage before making his professional debut the following year, playing the 2012–13 season with both the Portland Pirates of the American Hockey League (AHL) and the Gwinnett Gladiators of the ECHL.

Phoenix/Arizona Coyotes
In the 2014–15 season, after Arizona traded its backup goaltender Devan Dubnyk to the Minnesota Wild, Domingue was called up to the NHL for the first time to back-up starter Mike Smith. Domingue made his NHL debut appearing in relief and allowing two goals in a 7–2 defeat to the Ottawa Senators on January 31, 2015. The following day, Domingue received his first NHL start, and recorded his first win, in a 3–2 victory over the then-Eastern Conference-leading Montreal Canadiens. He finished the season as Smith's full-time backup.

In the 2015–16 season, Domingue was again recalled, following an injury to Mike Smith. Originally intended to back-up Anders Lindbäck during Smith's injury, Domingue's strong play moved him ahead of Lindbäck and into the temporary starting role. On June 27, 2016, Domingue signed a two-year contract extension with Arizona.

Tampa Bay Lightning
Domingue began the 2017–18 season as Arizona's backup goaltender. With an injury to newly acquired starter Antti Raanta from the New York Rangers, Domingue was unable to hold the fort, going winless in seven games. On October 29, 2017, Domingue was placed on waivers by the Coyotes, but cleared waivers the next day, and was the assigned to the Coyotes' AHL affiliate, the Tucson Roadrunners, on October 31, 2017. On November 14, 2017, before appearing with the Roadrunners, the Coyotes traded Domingue to the Tampa Bay Lightning in exchange for goaltender Michael Leighton and forward Tye McGinn.

On June 22, 2018, the Lightning signed Domingue to a two-year, $2.3 million contract extension. On December 10, 2018, Domingue was named the NHL's second star of the week. On February 2, 2019, Domingue helped the Lightning record a 3–2 win over the New York Rangers at Madison Square Garden. The win was Domingue's ninth straight win. The win tied him with John Grahame (2005–06) and Andrei Vasilevskiy (2017–18) for the longest win streak by a Lightning goaltender. On February 10, 2019, Domingue set the franchise record with his tenth straight win, which came in a 5–2 Lightning victory over the Florida Panthers at BB&T Center. On February 19, 2019, Domingue extended his win streak to 11-games in a 5–2 win over the Philadelphia Flyers at Wells Fargo Center. Domingue's streak came to an end against the Boston Bruins on February 28, 2019.

On September 20, 2019, Domingue was placed on waivers by the Lightning. He cleared the following day, and was assigned to the Syracuse Crunch to begin the 2019–20 season. In four games with the Crunch, Domingue posted a 2–1–1 record.

New Jersey Devils and Vancouver Canucks
On November 1, 2019, Domingue was traded to the New Jersey Devils in exchange for a conditional seventh round draft pick in the 2021 NHL Entry Draft. He initially joined AHL affiliate, the Binghamton Devils, before he was recalled by the Devils to serve as backup to Mackenzie Blackwood. Domingue struggled to assert himself as the Devils backup, collecting just 3 wins in 16 appearances, before he was placed on waivers and reassigned to the AHL with Binghamton.

On February 24, 2020, Domingue was traded to the Vancouver Canucks in exchange for Zane McIntyre. He immediately joined the club due to an injury to Jacob Markström. He made a lone appearance with the Canucks in a 5–3 defeat to the Columbus Blue Jackets on March 1, 2020, and remained with the club after the COVID-19 pandemic pause, as the Canucks' third-string goaltender in the return-to-play postseason.

Calgary Flames
As a free agent, Domingue joined the Calgary Flames, on a one-year, two-way contract on October 11, 2020. In the shortened 2020–21 season, Domingue was primarily used in a depth role, assigned to the Flames extended taxi squad. He made three appearances with AHL affiliate, the Stockton Heat, before making his lone appearance with the Flames, allowing three goals in a 4–2 defeat against his former club, the Vancouver Canucks, on May 18, 2021.

Pittsburgh Penguins
In the following off-season, having left the Flames as a free agent, Domingue extended his career in the NHL by agreeing to a one-year, two-way contract with the Pittsburgh Penguins on September 2, 2021. Domingue spent most of the regular season in the AHL with the Wilkes-Barre/Scranton Penguins, the Pittsburgh team's minor league affiliate, recording a 10–9–4 record and a .924 save percentage. He appeared in two games with the Pittsburgh Penguins, going 1–1–0 with a .952 save percentage. After the Penguins' starting goaltender Tristan Jarry injured his foot weeks before the 2022 Stanley Cup playoffs, Domingue was called up to serve as temporary backup goaltender to Casey DeSmith.

Domingue was unexpectedly called into service in Game 1 of the first round matchup against the New York Rangers after DeSmith exited midway through the second overtime period with a lower body injury, and stopped all 17 shots he faced before Evgeni Malkin won the game for Pittsburgh in triple overtime. Domingue noted that he had not expected to play and had eaten "quite the meal" of spicy pork and broccoli between the first and second overtime periods. "Spicy pork and broccoli" soon became an meme among Pittsburgh fans, and the team itself. DeSmith was subsequently ruled out for the remainder of the playoffs, leaving Domingue as the team's starting goaltender. He then recorded his first victorious postseason start in Game 3 on May 7 to give the Penguins a 2–1 series lead. The series attracted media attention for Domingue's success versus the Rangers' starting goaltender Igor Shesterkin, the favourite for the Vezina Trophy, who was pulled from the net in both games 3 & 4. The series turned against the Penguins in game 5 when captain Sidney Crosby was forced to exit midway through, and he allowed a bad goal late in Game 6. Consequently, they lost Games 5 & 6. Jarry returned to the net for Game 7, but they were eliminated.

New York Rangers
As a free agent from the Penguins, Domingue joined his seventh club in agreeing to a two-year, $1.55 million contract with the New York Rangers on July 13, 2022. On October 2, he was assigned to the Hartford Wolf Pack of the AHL.

Career statistics

Regular season and playoffs

Awards and honours

Records

Tampa Bay Lightning 
Longest win streak by a Tampa Bay Lightning goaltender, 11 (2018–19)

References

External links
 

1992 births
Living people
Arizona Coyotes draft picks
Arizona Coyotes players
Binghamton Devils players
Calgary Flames players
Canadian expatriate ice hockey players in the United States
Canadian ice hockey goaltenders
Gwinnett Gladiators players
Hartford Wolf Pack players
Ice hockey people from Quebec
Moncton Wildcats players
New Jersey Devils players
Pittsburgh Penguins players
Portland Pirates players
Quebec Remparts players
Springfield Falcons players
Stockton Heat players
Syracuse Crunch players
Tampa Bay Lightning players
Vancouver Canucks players
Wilkes-Barre/Scranton Penguins players